"Dirty Paws" is a song written and recorded by Icelandic band Of Monsters and Men for their debut studio album, My Head Is an Animal. It is the opening track and the title of the album comes from a line in the song, and was released as its second single in April 2012 in the United Kingdom, Ireland and Europe.

It was featured in the trailer and soundtrack to The Secret Life of Walter Mitty.

Lyric video
A lyric video to the song was released in 2014. The video features a large two-legged creature carrying a flag through an Icelandic mountainscape, with squadrons of phoenix-like birds flying in the sky. It fits with the lyrics of the song, "The sky wasn't big enough for them all" and "The birds, they got help from below."

Track listing

Charts

Weekly charts

Year-end charts

Certifications

References

2012 singles
Of Monsters and Men songs
Universal Music Group singles
2012 songs